Deer Park Town Center is an upscale lifestyle center in the northwest Chicago suburb of Deer Park, Illinois, situated at the southwest corner of U.S. Highway 12 (Rand Road) and Long Grove Road, just north of Lake Cook Road. It opened on October 27, 2000, and is a one-level, open air lifestyle shopping center.

The shopping center consists of over 70 retailers and restaurants, spread across 407,293 square feet (37,838 m2) and generates considerable traffic from throughout the northwest suburbs, primarily in the Barrington, Lake Zurich, Long Grove, Palatine, Kildeer and Buffalo Grove communities, and from farther places as well.

Anchors
Century Theatres
Barnes & Noble
Crate & Barrel
Gap
Banana Republic
Pottery Barn
Apple Store

Restaurants
California Pizza Kitchen
Stoney River Legendary Steaks
Panera Bread
Starbucks
Noodles & Company
Cold Stone Creamery
Teavana
Red Robin

External links
 Deer Park Town Center

References

Shopping malls in Lake County, Illinois
Lifestyle centers (retail)